Clifford Philip Case Jr. (April 16, 1904March 5, 1982), was an American lawyer and politician. A member of the Republican Party, he served as a U.S. Representative (1945–1953) and a U.S. Senator (1955–1979) from New Jersey. He is currently the most recent elected Republican senator from New Jersey (the next two Republican senators after Case were appointed by Republican governors).

Early life and education
The oldest of six children, Clifford Case was born in the Franklin Park section of Franklin Township, New Jersey, to Clifford Philip and Jeannette McAlpin (née Benedict) Case. His father was a minister in the Dutch Reformed Church. His father was also a staunch Republican who even canceled his subscription to The New York Times after it endorsed Woodrow Wilson in the 1912 presidential election. His uncle, Clarence E. Case, served as a member of the New Jersey Senate and as Chief Justice of the New Jersey Supreme Court. His great-grandfather was a court crier in Somerset County.

After serving at Six Mile Run Reformed Church in Franklin Park, his father accepted a position as pastor in Poughkeepsie, New York, in 1907. Case received his early education at public schools in Poughkeepsie, and graduated from Poughkeepsie High School in 1921. His class predicted he would become vice president of the United States, adding, "His good nature, however, and his stubborn hair will keep the Cabinet happy and harmonious." Following his high school graduation, he enrolled at Rutgers University in 1921. His father died the year before, and Case helped pay for his tuition by working part-time jobs, including playing the pipe organ in church on Sundays. At Rutgers, he was a member of the varsity lacrosse team, the Glee Club, the Rutgers chapter of Delta Upsilon, the Phi Beta Kappa Society, and Cap and Skull. He graduated with a Bachelor of Arts degree in 1925.

Case then studied at Columbia Law School, receiving his Bachelor of Laws degree in 1928. That same year, he married Ruth Miriam Smith, whom he had met in his junior year at Rutgers. The couple remained married until his death; they had two daughters, Mary Jane and Ann, and one son, Clifford Philip III.

Early career
In 1928, Case was admitted to the bar in New York and joined the law firm of Simpson Thacher & Bartlett in New York City, where he remained until 1953. He returned to New Jersey, living in Rahway while commuting to work in New York City. He entered politics in 1937, when he was elected to the Rahway Common Council, serving from 1938 to 1942. From 1943 to 1945, he was a member of the New Jersey General Assembly.

U.S. Representative
In 1944, Case successfully ran for the United States House of Representatives from New Jersey's 6th congressional district. He defeated his Democratic opponent, Walter H. Van Hoesen, by a margin of 55%-43%. He was subsequently re-elected to four more terms, never receiving less than 55% of the vote. In 1952, he won 20,000 more votes than any other candidate ever received in his district and won 10,000 more votes than Dwight D. Eisenhower's majority. During his entire tenure, Case's district was coterminous with Union County.

As a member of the House, Case earned a reputation as a liberal Republican, frequently receiving the endorsement of the Americans for Democratic Action, Congress of Industrial Organizations, and American Federation of Labor. He once said, "If the needs of this country are not met by middle-of-the-road progressivism, the problems won't be met, and the time will come when only extremist solutions are possible." A strong supporter of the Civil Rights Movement, he voted in favor of an anti-poll tax measure, a proposal to prevent segregation in the Women's Reserve of the Coast Guard, and the creation of a Fair Employment Practices Commission to prohibit discrimination in the workforce. He also opposed the establishment of a permanent House Un-American Activities Committee and the overriding of President Harry S. Truman's veto of the Immigration and Nationality Act of 1952. He served on the Civil Service, Education, and Judiciary Committees.

In 1953, Case was an unsuccessful candidate for the Republican nomination for Governor of New Jersey. In August of that year, he resigned from the House to become president of the Ford Foundation's Fund for the Republic, an organization dedicated to protecting freedom of speech and other civil liberties in the United States. He served in that position until March 1954.

U.S. Senate
In March 1954, after Republican incumbent Robert C. Hendrickson declined to run for re-election, Case announced his candidacy for Hendrickson's seat in the United States Senate. After winning the Republican primary, he faced fellow U.S. Representative Charles R. Howell in the general election. During the campaign, Case openly criticized Senator Joseph McCarthy, and pledged to vote against seating McCarthy on any committee with investigative functions. McCarthy's supporters called him "a pro-Communist Republicrat" and "Stalin's choice for Senator." The Star-Ledger quoted former Communist Party leader Bella Dodd as saying that Case's sister Adelaide was "an active member of several Communist front groups." It was later revealed, however, that the Adelaide Case in question was not the candidate's sister but a college professor who had died in 1948. A conservative faction within the Republican Party unsuccessfully attempted to force Case off the ballot, also proposing a write-in campaign for former U.S. Representative Fred A. Hartley Jr., co-author of the Taft-Hartley Act. Case was endorsed by President Eisenhower and Vice President Richard M. Nixon. In 1959, William F. Buckley Jr.'s National Review magazine in the article "Hopeless Case" appraised Case's liberal positions within the Republican Party.

On November 2, 1954, Case narrowly defeated Howell by a margin of 3,369 votes. It was the closest Senate election in New Jersey's history, and a recount was held on the following December 14. Case won the recount by 3,507 votes. In the Senate, he compiled one of the most liberal records of any Republican.  He was re-elected in 1960, 1966 and 1972. Case voted in favor of the Civil Rights Acts of 1957, 1960, 1964, and 1968, as well as the 24th Amendment to the U.S. Constitution, the Voting Rights Act of 1965, and the confirmation of Thurgood Marshall to the U.S. Supreme Court.

In 1966, along with two other Republican Senators and five Republican Representatives, Case signed a telegram sent to Georgia Governor Carl E. Sanders regarding the Georgia legislature's refusal to seat the recently elected Julian Bond in their state House of Representatives. This refusal, said the telegram, was "a dangerous attack on representative government. None of us agree with Mr. Bond's views on the Vietnam War; in fact we strongly repudiate these views. But unless otherwise determined by a court of law, which the Georgia Legislature is not, he is entitled to express them."

At the 1968 Republican National Convention, Case attempted to hold the New Jersey's delegation's 40 votes as a favorite son candidate to prevent Richard Nixon being selected on the first ballot and thus give Case's preferred candidate, Nelson Rockefeller, a chance of being chosen in later ballots. Case failed to hold the delegation together and 18 delegates deserted Case's favorite son candidacy for Nixon. Nixon was nominated on the first ballot. Case was a co-author of the Case-Zablocki Act of 1972 which required that executive agreements by the president be reported to Congress in 60 days.  He also co-sponsored the Case–Church Amendment which prohibited further U.S. military activity in Vietnam, Laos and Cambodia in 1973.

Case sought a fifth Senate term in 1978, but lost the Republican primary to Jeffrey Bell, an anti-tax conservative. Bell went on to lose the general election to Democrat Bill Bradley, a former professional basketball player.  No Republican has been elected to represent New Jersey in the Senate since Case's last victory in 1972 (Republicans Nicholas F. Brady and Jeffrey Chiesa served only as appointees).

Later life and death
After leaving the Senate, Case resumed the practice of law  with Curtis, Mallet-Prevost, Colt & Mosle, a New York law firm. Case also lectured at Rutgers University's Eagleton Institute of Politics.  He died in Washington, D.C., and was interred at the Somerville New Cemetery in Somerville, New Jersey.

His grandson, former Clinton Mayor Matthew Holt, was elected to the Hunterdon County Board of Chosen Freeholders in 2005. He ran for the General Assembly seat in the 23rd legislative district that was vacated by Marcia A. Karrow in January 2009.

References

External links
 
 Clifford P. Case in the Rutgers University Hall of Distinguished Alumni
Clifford Philip Case at The Political Graveyard
Clifford Philip Case at Rutgers University Libraries: This Web site serves as a companion to the permanent exhibition on the senator's life and work which was installed in the Clifford P. Case Seminar Room at Alexander Library in October 2006.
 

Columbia Law School alumni
Republican Party members of the New Jersey General Assembly
People from Franklin Township, Somerset County, New Jersey
People from Rahway, New Jersey
Politicians from Somerset County, New Jersey
Rutgers University alumni
Candidates in the 1968 United States presidential election
1904 births
1982 deaths
Republican Party United States senators from New Jersey
Republican Party members of the United States House of Representatives from New Jersey
20th-century American politicians
Simpson Thacher & Bartlett